Pedro Nava (February 6, 1948) is an American lawyer and former politician who served as a Democratic member of the California State Assembly from 2004 to 2010. He represented parts of Santa Barbara and Ventura Counties. Nava works as a lawyer and consultant, specializing in the area of government relations. Nava ran unsuccessfully in the 2010 Democratic California Attorney General primary election.

Nava served on the California Coastal Commission from 1997 to 2004. He was initially appointed by Speaker of the Assembly Cruz Bustamante and then reappointed to the Coastal Commission by then President pro Tempore of the Senate John Burton. Following his career in the Legislature, Nava was appointed to serve on the Little Hoover Commission. On the Commission he has been reelected to eight consecutive term as chair in March 2021. He also works as a Government relations advisor. Former civil litigator, deputy district attorney and member of the California Coastal Commission. Appointed by Assembly Speaker Emeritus John Pérez in April 2013 and reappointed by Assembly Speaker Anthony Rendon in January 2017 and again in January 2021.

References

External links
Join California - Pedro Nava

1948 births
American politicians of Mexican descent
Hispanic and Latino American state legislators in California
Living people
Democratic Party members of the California State Assembly
University of California, Davis alumni
21st-century American politicians